The Liberty Heights neighborhood is a neighborhood in Springfield, Massachusetts. 

Located along Springfield's northern border, with easy access to I-291 and the Mass Turnpike (I-90) Liberty Heights is a residential neighborhood full of a variety of 20th century housing types, such as: Craftsman, Colonial Revival, Tudor Revival, Capes, and Ranches. Liberty Heights has a branch library that offers a wide variety of family activities.

Liberty Heights is home to Van Horn Park, one of the city's largest public parks, the Liberty Plaza shopping center, Salerno Pizzeria, Jackies Pizza, and some of the city's largest employers, such as Baystate Medical Center and Smith & Wesson. The Liberty Heights neighborhoods are also close to Elms College in Chicopee.

In addition to the public and parochial schools in these neighborhoods, the private Academy Hill School serves students in grades K-8.

References

Neighborhoods in Springfield, Massachusetts